Peter Fleming and John McEnroe were the defending champions, but lost in the semifinals to Pat Cash and John Fitzgerald.

Heinz Günthardt and Balázs Taróczy defeated Cash and Fitzgerald in the final, 6–4, 6–3, 4–6, 6–3 to win the gentlemen's doubles title at the 1985 Wimbledon Championships.

Seeds

  Peter Fleming /  John McEnroe (semifinals)
  Pavel Složil /  Tomáš Šmíd (second round)
  Ken Flach /  Robert Seguso (first round)
  Stefan Edberg /  Anders Järryd (third round)
  Pat Cash /  John Fitzgerald (final)
  Mark Edmondson /  Kim Warwick (first round)
  Joakim Nyström /  Mats Wilander (first round)
  Heinz Günthardt /  Balázs Taróczy (champions)
  Paul Annacone /  Christo van Rensburg (quarterfinals)
  Broderick Dyke /  Wally Masur (first round)
  Francisco González /  Matt Mitchell (first round)
  Henri Leconte /  Yannick Noah (second round)
  Tony Giammalva /  Sammy Giammalva (second round)
  Kevin Curren /  Johan Kriek (quarterfinals)
  Steve Meister /  Eliot Teltscher (third round)
  Peter Doohan /  Michael Fancutt (first round)

Draw

Finals

Top half

Section 1

Section 2

Bottom half

Section 3

Section 4

References

External links

1985 Wimbledon Championships – Men's draws and results at the International Tennis Federation

Men's Doubles
Wimbledon Championship by year – Men's doubles